Mofu is a surname. Notable people with the surname include:

 Vendry Mofu (born 1989), Indonesian footballer
 Irvan Mofu (born 1991), Indonesian footballer

See also
 Mofu people

Surnames of African origin